Hedgehog tenrec may refer to:
 Lesser hedgehog tenrec (Echinops telfairi)
 Greater hedgehog tenrec (Setifer setosus), also known as large Madagascar hedgehog

Animal common name disambiguation pages